Valeria Sergeevna Mikhailova (born 14 February 2002) is a Russian figure skater.

Career 
Mikhailova finished 13th at the 2014 Russian Junior Championships and 9th at the 2015 Russian Junior Championships.

Mikhailova made her international debut on the 2015–16 ISU Junior Grand Prix (JGP) series. After placing 5th in Slovakia, she finished 4th at her next JGP assignment, in the United States.

In September 2017, Mikhailova was assigned to a senior Grand Prix event, the 2017 Rostelecom Cup, where she placed 7th with a personal best score of 185.09 points.

Programs

Competitive highlights 
GP: Grand Prix; JGP: Junior Grand Prix

Detailed results

References

2002 births
Russian female single skaters
Living people